The 1991 E3 Harelbeke was the 34th edition of the E3 Harelbeke cycle race and was held on 30 March 1991. The race started and finished in Harelbeke. The race was won by Olaf Ludwig of the Panasonic team.

General classification

References

1991 in Belgian sport
March 1991 sports events in Europe
1991